World Soccer may refer to:

World Soccer (magazine), English language football magazine published by IPC Media
World Soccer, a game for the Sega Master System

See also
Geography of association football, a listing of all international teams
World Soccer Daily, a U.S. based soccer radio show and podcast